Amit Bhatt (born 19 August 1972) is an Indian television actor. He has appeared in a number of Hindi television serials. He is mostly known for playing the role of Champaklal Jayantilal Gada in the Hindi sitcom Taarak Mehta Ka Ooltah Chashmah.

Personal life
Bhatt is from Saurashtra region of Gujarat. He is a Bachelor in Commerce (B.Com.). He is currently living with his family in Mumbai. Bhatt is a father of twin sons.

Career

Bhatt appeared in several television serials such as Khichdi, Yes Boss, Chupke Chupke, Funny Family.com, Gupshup Coffee Shop, F.I.R. before his portrayal of Champaklal Gada (Champak Chachaji) in Taarak Mehta Ka Ooltah Chashmah. Bhatt also appeared in the movie Loveyatri along with his twin sons in a cameo role.

Filmography

Film

Television

Awards and nominations

References

External links

1973 births
Living people
Male actors from Gujarat
Male actors in Hindi television
Indian male television actors